David Andjelic (Serbian: David Anđelić; Cyrillic: Давид Анђелић; born 27 April 1994) is a Serbian rugby league footballer. He is best known for competing on The NRL Rookie.

Early life
Born in Serbia, Andjelic and his mother Milijana moved to Mount Druitt, New South Wales, Australia when he was a child. He played his junior rugby league for St Patricks Blacktown, Minchinbury Jets, and Penrith Panthers.

Career
In 2016, Andjelic participated in the Nine Network's rugby league reality TV show, The NRL Rookie, being cut from the competition in week 5. His audition video, in which he ran through a wall of bricks, went viral around the world.

On 5 October, he was named in Serbia's 22-man squad for their 2017 World Cup qualifying campaign.

References

1994 births
Living people
Participants in Australian reality television series
Rugby league props
Serbia national rugby league team players
Serbian rugby league players
Serbian emigrants to Australia